Giovanni Battista Michelini (also called il Folignate) (1604–1655) was an Italian painter of the Baroque period, active mainly in Foligno and Rome. He was born in Foligno, but became a pupil of Guido Reni. He painted mainly religious and mythological subjects.

Known works
Hall of Cupid, Hall of Apollo: two frescoed rooms in the Palazzo Pierantoni in Foligno
The Foundation of Foligno: frescoed ceiling in the Palazzo De Comitibus, Foligno
an ensemble of large allegorical frescoes, in the church of S. Filippo, BevagnaMadonna and Child with St. Elysius (oil on canvas): Foligno, church of San Giovanni DecollatoHoly Family, St. Catherine, and an Immaculate Conception: all three works in Foligno, monastery of Santa CaterinaMadonna and child with saints (oil on canvas): church of San Francesco della Pace, GubbioScenes from the life of San Filippo Benizi'' (damaged frescoes in the lower arcade of the cloister of the Church of San Giacomo (Foligno)

1604 births
1655 deaths
17th-century Italian painters
Italian male painters
Umbrian painters
Italian Baroque painters